The 2013 UEFA European Under-19 Championship (qualifying round) was the first round of qualifications for the 2013 UEFA European Under-19 Championship final tournament.

The 48 participating teams were divided into 12 groups of four teams, with each group being contested as a mini-tournament hosted by one of the group's teams. After all matches have been played, the 12 group winners and 12 group runners-up along with the best third-placed team will advance to the Elite Round. Lithuania qualified as hosts while Spain, Serbia and Turkey received byes to the elite round as the sides with the highest coefficients. The draw for the qualifying round was held on 29 November 2011 in Nyon and matches were played between 26 September and 26 November 2012.

Seeds
A total of forty-eight participating teams were divided in two draw pots based on the UEFA Under-19 coefficient ranking. Before the draw UEFA confirmed that, for political reasons, Armenia and Azerbaijan would not host the mini-tournament if they are drawn in the same group due to the dispute concerning territory of Nagorno-Karabakh, with the same rule applying for Georgia and Russia due to the dispute regarding the territory of South Ossetia.

{| class="wikitable"
|-
! width=200|Pot A
! width=200|Pot B
|- style="vertical-align: top;"
|

|

The hosts of the twelve one-venue mini-tournament groups are indicated below in italics.

Tiebreakers
If two or more teams are equal on points on completion of the group matches, the following criteria are applied to determine the rankings.
 Higher number of points obtained in the group matches played among the teams in question
 Superior goal difference from the group matches played among the teams in question
 Higher number of goals scored in the group matches played among the teams in question
 If, after applying criteria 1) to 3) to several teams, two teams still have an equal ranking, the criteria 1) to 3) will be reapplied to determine the ranking of these teams. If this procedure does not lead to a decision, criteria 5) and 6) will apply
 Results of all group matches:
 Superior goal difference
 Higher number of goals scored
 Drawing of lots
Additionally, if two teams which have the same number of points and the same number of goals scored and conceded play their last group match against each other and are still equal at the end of that match, their final rankings are determined by the penalty shoot-out and not by the criteria listed above. This procedure is applicable only if a ranking of the teams is required to determine the group winner or the runners-up and the third-placed team.

Group 1

Group 2

Group 3

Group 4

Group 5

Group 6

Group 7

Group 8

Group 9

Group 10

Group 11

Group 12

Ranking of third-placed teams
To determine the best third-ranked team from the qualifying round, only the results of the third-placed team against the winners and runners-up in each group are taken into account.

Tiebreakers
The following criteria are applied to determine the rankings.
 Higher number of points obtained in these matches
 Superior goal difference from these matches
 Higher number of goals scored in these matches
 Fair play conduct of the teams in all group matches in the qualifying round
 Drawing of lots

References

External links
UEFA.com

Uefa European Under-19 Championship Qualification, 2013
2013 UEFA European Under-19 Championship
UEFA European Under-19 Championship qualification